The Jewish Council for Public Affairs (JCPA) is an American Jewish 501(c)(3) tax exempt organization that deals with community relations. It is a coordinating round table organization of 15 other national Jewish organizations, including the Reconstructionist, Reform, Conservative, and Orthodox congregational movements, as well as 125 local Jewish federations and community relations councils.  The JCPA describes itself as "the representative voice of the organized American Jewish community."

The JCPA was established as the National Community Relations Advisory Council in 1944 by the Council of Jewish Federations, which later became part of the United Jewish Communities, now the Jewish Federations of North America. In the 1960s, it was renamed the National Jewish Community Relations Advisory Council (NJCRAC). The group adopted its current name in 1997.  Arnold Aronson was program director from 1945 to 1976. David L. Bernstein served as president and chief executive officer since January 2016.  The immediate past chair is Larry Gold of Atlanta, Georgia.

Activities
The JCPA works on shaping consensus on public issues, developing strategic responses, and working with the media, elected officials, coalition partners, and others through public relations, advocacy, and lobbying. The JCPA also helps the 125 Jewish community relations councils organize events and advocacy around the country, promoting interfaith and community partnerships.

International issues that the JCPA is concerned with include Israel–United States relations, global antisemitism, the United Nations, the well-being of Jews in endangered areas, genocide, and human rights. Domestic issues that the JCPA is concerned with include anti-Semitism, social justice, poverty, education, public health, the environment, immigration, individual rights, and religious liberties including the preservation of the separation of church and state.

It has been active in supporting rights of Israeli Arabs and has fought for equality in Israel.

Policy
Each year the JCPA has an annual conference known as the Plenum, the highest policy-developing body of the organization. At the Plenum the JCPA hosts speakers and debates and adopts resolutions expressing the consensus policies of member organizations and the organized American Jewish community. Policies are sponsored by the Jewish Community Relations Councils or national member agencies and require consensus to be adopted. These policies become part of the "JCPA Policy Compendium," which includes positions on a range of issues.

The JCPA has three main task forces:
Israel, World Jewry, and International Human Rights
Jewish Security and The Bill of Rights
Equal Opportunity and Social Justice

Initiatives 

Shocked by the atrocities in Darfur, the JCPA helped found the Save Darfur Coalition in 2004. It continues to organize the Jewish community in support of continued US action to bring peace to Sudan, supporting the creation of South Sudan and working with the White House and Congress to ensure humanitarian assistance.

In September 2007, the JCPA launched an anti-poverty program "There shall be no needy among you."  The effort seeks to raise awareness and action to combat hunger, homelessness and other vestiges of poverty in America. The JCPA has led multiple Food Stamp Challenges, organizing Members of Congress, clergy, and others to live for one week on the average food stamp allotment of $31.50.  Starting in 2008, the JCPA and MAZON: A Jewish Response to Hunger have sponsored an annual Hunger Seder Mobilization, tying the Passover message of freedom to the ongoing struggles with hunger in America. The mobilization begins each year with a National Hunger Seder in the US Capitol where Members of Congress and national faith and anti-hunger advocates read from a specially prepared haggadah. Hunger Seders have been held in over 30 states across the country.

Along with Catholic Charities USA and the National Council of Churches, the JCPA has been a cosponsor of the annual Fighting Poverty with Faith mobilization since 2008. Fighting Poverty with Faith mobilizes community's to hold events aimed at making ending poverty a national priority with a different theme each year. Past themes have included "Good Jobs, Green Jobs," poverty, hunger, and affordable housing.

The JCPA is also actively involved in environmentalism and climate change issues though its program the Coalition on the Environment and Jewish Life (COEJL), an affiliate of the National Religious Partnership on the Environment.

In partnership with the Jewish Federations of North America, the JCPA created the Israel Action Network in 2010 to help communities counter the delegitimization of Israel. The IAN was created to educate, organize and mobilize the organized North American Jewish community to develop strategic approaches to attacks on Israel and use partnerships to promote peace and security for two states for two peoples.

Other national campaigns of the JCPA have included the Vote On Guns campaign to end gun violence following the 2012 Sandy Hook Elementary School shooting and the 2013 "Immigration Nation" campaign in support of comprehensive immigration reform.

Members
The 15 national member agencies of the JCPA are:
American Jewish Committee
American Jewish Congress
American ORT
Anti-Defamation League
B'nai B'rith
Hadassah
Jewish Labor Committee
Jewish Reconstructionist Federation
Jewish War Veterans of the United States of America
Jewish Women International
National Council of Jewish Women
Union for Reform Judaism
Union of Orthodox Jewish Congregations of America
United Synagogue of Conservative Judaism
Women's League for Conservative Judaism

See also 
 Hannah Rosenthal

References

External links
 
 Records of National Jewish Community Relations Advisory Council at the American Jewish Historical Society, New York, NY and Boston, MA

Israel–United States relations
Jewish lobbying
Jewish-American political organizations
1944 establishments in the United States
Organizations established in 1944
Organizations based in New York City